"Hair by Mr. Bean of London" is the fourteenth episode of the British television series Mr. Bean, produced by Tiger Aspect Productions in association with Thames Video in 1995. It was first released on VHS as an exclusive direct-to-video episode in 1995, and was not broadcast on television in the United Kingdom until eleven years later, on 13 August 2006.

Plot

Act 1: The Barbershop 
Mr. Bean visits a barber shop to get a haircut. While Derrick, the barber, is taking a phone call, Bean entertains himself by pretending to cut someone else's hair. A boy named Jamie arrives with his mother, who assumes Bean is the hairdresser. After the mother leaves to retrieve her purse, Bean places a bowl over Jamie's head and cuts his shoulder-length mullet into a bowl hairstyle. He then accidentally shaves off a small piece of Jamie's hair and ends up shaving a large gap down the middle of his head to even it out. Although it looks ridiculous, Jamie is satisfied with his new hairstyle.

After Jamie's mother returns and pays Bean for the haircut (which she cannot see as Bean has covered Jamie's hair with a cap), Bean returns to his seat. Derrick gets off the phone, only for it to ring again; Bean resumes being the substitute hairdresser. The next customer is a man with a ponytail. While trimming the ponytail, Bean is distracted by the magazine the man is reading and accidentally severs the ponytail. He puts a portrait of a different ponytailed man over a mirror to deceive the man, who pays Bean and leaves.

Bean's final customer is a man named Roger, who mistakes Bean for Derrick after taking off his glasses. Bean proceeds to use the hair clipper but accidentally shaves off Roger's toupee, causing it to get stuck in the clipper. He applies mousse on Roger's bald spot and using bits of hair from the floor to create a new "toupee." After Derrick gets off the phone and Roger leaves, Jamie's mother and the man with the ponytail storm in and furiously demand to know where Derrick's supposed assistant is. As Bean sneaks away, hiding his face with a calendar of Prince Charles, Roger storms in and mistakes Bean for Charles, curtseying towards him, before berating Derrick for his haircut.

Act 2: The Fête and the Pet Show 
Bean heads to a fête where he is unable to find somewhere to park his Mini, so he instead parks in one of the sheep pens after sounding the horn in order to get the sheep out of the way. Upon going inside the fête tents, he cheats at the indoor games, such as nudging a young boy playing a wire loop game, causing him to lose the game. He then plays the game himself, but after failing on the first attempt, he unplugs it and wins; the owner only realises it has been unplugged after giving Bean his prize. Afterwards, Bean plays a game called "Hit the Headmaster", where he must throw wet sponges at the "headmaster" (George Webb) in which he gets a bit carried away by throwing random objects, such as canned peas and cereal boxes, at the "headmaster". A nearby teacher stops him before he attempts to throw a chair.

Later, Bean participates at a pet show by entering Teddy into the competition (the other participants being dogs). Luckily for Bean, Teddy's inanimacy turns out to be an advantage, thus winning the contest. At the end of the show, two kids are awarded a ribbon each while Bean is awarded a huge bone by one of the contest organisers. However, Bean does not want it, so he instead takes a jar of honey to his satisfaction. Following this, he throws the bone back into the tent, inadvertently creating chaos off-screen involving the children and their dogs, who are presumably fighting for the bone. As the chaos ensues, Bean promptly exits the tent with Teddy.

Act 3: The Railway Station 
Bean disembarks from a train at St Pancras railway station and realises that he has lost his ticket on the way. He tries to sneak past a security guard by hiding inside a mail bag and crawling towards the gate. When the guard leaves, Bean climbs onto the gate, but two station workers turn the gate around (while they see the bag hanging on the gate). Bean crawls off the gate (while celebrating he has finally made it though) and ends up falling onto the railway tracks. Two station workers appear and put the mailbag (with Bean still inside) on board a train carrying mail and cargo that is destined for Moscow. As the end credits roll, short clips of a ship sailing through a rough sea (which indicates the ship is carrying mail and cargo from the train earlier), and then of a French steam train carrying passenger coaches, and of marching soldiers in the Red Square (indicating that Bean indeed ended up in Russia) are seen.

Cast
 Rowan Atkinson as Mr. Bean
 Tony Haase as Derrick (barber)
 Colin Wells as the man with a ponytail
 Frederick Treves as Roger
 George Webb as the headmaster
 Robin Driscoll as the railway station security guard
 C.J. Allen as Colonal
 Susie McKenna as Jamie's mum
 Jamie Yeates as Jamie
 Matthew Ashforde (uncredited)

Production 
As per the other episodes, studio sequences were recorded before a live audience at Teddington Studios.

On the door of the railway coach next to the English inscription of "MOSCOW", some mock Cyrillic writing is visible "НПУЛЦА" (npultsa) instead of "МОСКВА". Co-writer Robin Driscoll made a cameo appearance as the railway guard - his first since "Mr. Bean Goes to Town". The original recording of the choral theme by the Choir of Southwark Cathedral, was used in the opening titles. However, the end credits incorrectly credited it to the Choir of Christ Church Cathedral, Oxford.

Act 1 inspired the Mr. Bean: The Animated Series episode "Haircut". A train scene inspired by Act 3 was featured in the film Mr. Bean's Holiday.

Broadcast 
"Hair by Mr. Bean of London" was first released on VHS in 1995 as a video exclusive and until 2006, it was the only episode never to air on any British television network. This episode was broadcast overseas and received its Irish premiere on RTÉ One in 2005 - it also aired on ABC in Australia in August 2001 and on TV3 in New Zealand in November 2001..

The episode was first screened on United Kingdom television on 13 August 2006, when it was shown on satellite, pay TV and cable channel Comedy Central Extra (then known as Paramount Comedy 2) and 25 August 2006 on Nickelodeon UK but for some time, it remained the only full-length episode not to air on terrestrial television in the UK. It has since been broadcast on ITV3 and ITV4.

References

External links 
 

Mr. Bean episodes
1995 British television episodes
Television shows written by Rowan Atkinson
Television shows written by Robin Driscoll